Araldo may refer to:

Given name
Araldo Caprili (1920–1982), Italian footballer
Araldo Cossutta (1925–2017), Croatian-born American architect
Araldo di Crollalanza (1892–1986), Italian journalist and politician

Other uses
Araldo (horse) (2008–2014), British thoroughbred racehorse
Araldo Telefonico